Cymbiola aulica, also known as the Princely or Courtier Volute is a species of sea snail, a marine gastropod mollusk in the family Volutidae, the volutes.

Subspecies
 Cymbiola aulica aulica Sowerby, G.B. I, 1825
 Cymbiola aulica cathcartiae L. A. Reeve, 1856

Distribution
This species is present in the Southern Philippines (Sulu Sea).

Description

These large shells are solid to thick, ovate, completely smooth, with subconical spire and sharp nodules on shoulders of whorls. Siphonal notch is narrow and deep. Columella shows six plaits. The aperture is usually wide orange with hues of greyish blue. The colour pattern of the external surface of these Schnecke is very variable, ranging from reddish to orange or whitish with brown markings and zig zag lines.

Habitat
These sea snails live in sandy and muddy substrate at depths of 5 to 40 m.

Bibliography
 Bail P. & Poppe G.T. 2001. A conchological iconography: a taxonomic introduction of the recent Volutidae. ConchBooks, Hackenheim.
 Harald Douté, M. A. Fontana Angioy - Volutes, The Doute collection
 Hsi-Jen Tao - Shells of Taiwan Illustrated in Colour - National Museum of Natural Science
 MacDonald & Co (1979) The MacDonald Encyclopedia of Shells. MacDonald & Co. London & Sydney
Springsteen, F.J. & Leobrera, F.M. 1986. Shells of the Philippines. Carfel Seashell Museum, Philippines

References

External links
 Encyclopedia of life

Volutidae
Gastropods described in 1825